DWHP (99.5 FM), broadcasting as 99.5 iFM, is a radio station owned and operated by Radio Mindanao Network. The station's studio and transmitter are located at the Hernandez Bldg., F. R. Castro St. cor. Dr. D. Samonte St., Laoag.

References

External links
iFM Laoag FB Page
iFM Laoag Website

Radio stations established in 1978
Radio stations in Ilocos Norte